Rickart's dyak fruit bat (Dyacopterus rickarti) is a species of megabat in the family Pteropodidae found on Luzon and Mindanao islands, in the Philippines.

References

 Mammals Planet website: Species Sheet. 

Rickart's dyak fruit bat
Bats of Southeast Asia
Mammals of the Philippines
Endemic fauna of the Philippines
Fauna of Luzon
Fauna of Mindanao
Rickart's dyak fruit bat